Terry Fanolua (born 3 July 1974) is a Samoan rugby union player. He played as a Centre for Gloucester and Samoa for a number of years.

Fanolua played for Gloucester for ten years and became a member of the 100 league games club. In 2006, he switched clubs joining French side Brive.

He is currently playing for Hartpury College R.F.C.

Notes

Living people
Samoan rugby union players
1974 births
Samoa international rugby union players
CA Brive players
Gloucester Rugby players
Samoan expatriate rugby union players
Expatriate rugby union players in England
Expatriate rugby union players in France
Samoan expatriate sportspeople in France
Samoan expatriate sportspeople in England
Rugby union centres